Marjorie Morningstar is a fictional character created by American writer Herman Wouk and can refer to:

 Marjorie Morningstar (novel), a 1955 novel, which introduced the character
 Marjorie Morningstar (film), a 1958 film, based on the novel